Lee Kwang-Jin (born 23 July 1991) is a South Korean footballer who plays as midfielder for Gyeongnam FC in K League 1.

Career
He joined FC Seoul in 2010. but didn't make any appearance in FC Seoul.

He moved to Daejeon Citizen after a successful loan spell with Gwangju FC.

References

External links 

1991 births
Living people
Association football midfielders
South Korean footballers
FC Seoul players
Daegu FC players
Gwangju FC players
Daejeon Hana Citizen FC players
Suwon FC players
Gyeongnam FC players
K League 1 players
K League 2 players